Corey Harris may refer to:

 Corey Harris (born 1969), American musician
 Corey Harris (American football, born 1969), American football player
 Corey Harris (American football, born 1976), American football player